Posener is a surname of German origin, a demonym for a person from the Polish city Poznań (German: Posen). Notable people with the surname include:

 Alan Posener (born 1949), British-German journalist
 Edith Head born Edith Claire Posener (1897–1981), American costume designer 
 Jill Posener (born 1953), British photographer and playwright
 Joachim Posener (born 1964), Swedish financier and author
 Julius Posener (1904–1996), German architectural historian
  (born 1987), British actress; see Ninjak
 Paule Posener-Kriéger (1925–1996), French Egyptologist
 Zara Posener (born 1984), British actress

See also
 Posner
 Posen

German-language surnames
Toponymic surnames
Polish toponymic surnames
German toponymic surnames
Jewish surnames
Yiddish-language surnames